Grab is a village in the municipality of Trebinje, Republika Srpska, Bosnia and Herzegovina. In the census of 1991, there were 135 people, all Serbs.

References

Villages in Republika Srpska
Populated places in Trebinje